Living Time is an album by the Bill Evans George Russell Orchestra recorded in 1972 and released on the Columbia label, featuring performances by Evans with an orchestra conducted by Russell.

Reception
The Allmusic review by Scott Yanow awarded the album 2 stars and stated "The music on this set unfortunately is not all that interesting. Russell's lengthy and episodic work "Living Time" (which has eight "events") features crowded ensembles as played by Evans' trio plus 19 musicians (including two additional keyboardists). Despite the major names in the "backup group" the focus throughout is on Evans' acoustic and electric keyboards. The problem is that the music is rather dull and surprisingly forgettable."

Track listing
All compositions by George Russell
 "Living Time: Event I" – 3:50  
 "Living Time: Event II" – 8:22  
 "Living Time: Event III" – 2:47  
 "Living Time: Event IV" – 5:30  
 "Living Time: Event V" – 11:52  
 "Living Time: Event VI" – 4:13  
 "Living Time: Event VII" – 2:07  
 "Living Time: Event VIII" – 5:38

Personnel
George Russell – arranger, conductor
Bill Evans – piano, Fender Rhodes piano 
Snooky Young, Ernie Royal, Richard Williams – trumpet, flugelhorn
Stanton Davis – trumpet 
Howard Johnson – flugelhorn, tuba, bass clarinet    
John Clark – french horn  
Dave Bargeron – tuba  
Jimmy Giuffre – tenor saxophone, flute 
  Joe Henderson - tenor saxophone   
Sam Rivers – tenor saxophone, flute, oboe  
Sam Brown – bass guitar, electric guitar  
Ted Saunders – electric piano, clavinet  
Webster Lewis – organ, electric piano  
Eddie Gómez – acoustic bass
Ron Carter (on 5,7), Stanley Clarke (on 1,2,3), Herb Bushler (on 4,6,8) – Fender bass  
Tony Williams, Marty Morell – drums
Marc Belair – percussion
 Edd Kolakowski - Steinway piano technician

References

George Russell (composer) albums
Bill Evans albums
1972 albums
Columbia Records albums
Collaborative albums